Protein phosphatase 2 (PP2), also known as PP2A,  is an enzyme that in humans is encoded by the PPP2CA gene. The PP2A heterotrimeric protein phosphatase is ubiquitously expressed, accounting for a large fraction of phosphatase activity in eukaryotic cells. Its serine/threonine phosphatase activity has a broad substrate specificity and diverse cellular functions. Among the targets of PP2A are proteins of oncogenic signaling cascades, such as Raf, MEK, and AKT, where PP2A may act as a tumor suppressor.

Structure and function 
PP2A consists of a dimeric core enzyme composed of the structural A and catalytic C subunits, and a regulatory B subunit. When the PP2A catalytic C subunit associates with the A and B subunits several species of holoenzymes are produced with distinct functions and characteristics.  The A subunit, a founding member of the HEAT repeat protein family (huntington-elongation-A subunit-TOR), is the scaffold required for the formation of the heterotrimeric complex.  When the A subunit binds it alters the enzymatic activity of the catalytic subunit, even if the B subunit is absent.  While C and A subunit sequences show remarkable sequence conservation throughout eukaryotes, regulatory B subunits are more heterogeneous and are believed to play key roles in controlling the localization and specific activity of different holoenzymes. Multicellular eukaryotes express four classes of variable regulatory subunits: B (PR55), B′ (B56 or PR61), B″ (PR72), and B‴ (PR93/PR110), with at least 16 members in these subfamilies. In addition, accessory proteins and post-translational modifications (such as methylation) control PP2A subunit associations and activities.

The two catalytic metal ions located in PP2A's active site are manganese.

Drug discovery 
PP2 has been identified as a potential biological target to discover drugs to treat Parkinson's disease and Alzheimer's disease, however as of 2014 it was unclear which isoforms would be most beneficial to target, and also whether activation or inhibition would be most therapeutic.

PP2 has also been identified as a tumor suppressor for blood cancers, and as of 2015 programs were underway to identify compounds that could either directly activate it, or that could inhibit other proteins that suppress its activity.

References

Further reading

External links 
 
Rubratoxin

Human proteins
EC 3.1.3